Adul Baldé or simply Adul (born April 9, 1989) is a Bissau-Guinean footballer.

External links

 

1989 births
Living people
Sportspeople from Bissau
Bissau-Guinean footballers
Guinea-Bissau international footballers
Primeira Liga players
C.F. Estrela da Amadora players
Vitória F.C. players
S.C. Covilhã players
Doxa Katokopias FC players
Bissau-Guinean expatriate footballers
Expatriate footballers in Cyprus
Bissau-Guinean expatriate sportspeople in Portugal
Bissau-Guinean expatriate sportspeople in Cyprus
Bissau-Guinean expatriate sportspeople in Luxembourg
C.D. Pinhalnovense players
Cypriot Second Division players
Expatriate footballers in Luxembourg
Luxembourg Division of Honour players

Association football forwards